Line of Duty is a British BBC police procedural television series created by Jed Mercurio. Initially, broadcast began on BBC Two, starting on 26 June 2012. The fourth series broadcast began on 26 March 2017 on BBC One. The stories feature the Anti-Corruption Unit 12 (AC-12) led by Superintendent Ted Hastings (Adrian Dunbar). Set within the fictional Central Police Force it focuses on the activities of two senior AC-12 officers, Detective Inspector Steve Arnott (Martin Compston) and Detective Inspector Kate Fleming (Vicky McClure).

Series overview

Series 1 (2012)

Series 2 (2014)

Series 3 (2016)

Series 4 (2017)

Series 5 (2019)

Series 6 (2021)

Ratings

Notes

References

Lists of British drama television series episodes
Lists of British crime television series episodes
List of episodes
Line of Duty